William Wyman May (March 17, 1887 – November 1979) was an American athlete who competed at the 1908 Summer Olympics in London. He was born in Knoxville, Alabama and died in Utica, New York. He graduated from Rochelle Township High School in Rochelle, Illinois in 1905 and won the State Championship in the 50 yard dash.

In the 100 metres event, May won his first round heat with a time of 11.2 seconds.  He was eliminated in the semifinals, running the course in 11.0 seconds but taking second place in his heat to Reggie Walker who tied the Olympic record at 10.8 seconds. He lost to Robert Kerr in the preliminary heats of the 200 metres competition.  May was eliminated while Kerr went on to win the gold medal in the event.

References

Sources
 William W. May's profile at Sports Reference.com
 
 
 

1887 births
1979 deaths
American male sprinters
Olympic track and field athletes of the United States
Athletes (track and field) at the 1908 Summer Olympics
People from Knoxville, Alabama